The Decauville railway Narès–Inglis–Topçin–Vatiluk was around 1916 a  long narrow-gauge military railway near Thessaloniki in Greece with a gauge of

Route 

References 

\
Rail transport in Greece
Railway lines opened in 1916
600 mm gauge railways in Greece
Decauville